La Mirada (Spanish for "The Look") is a city in southeast Los Angeles County, California United States, and is one of the Gateway Cities. The population was 48,527 at the 2010 census, up from 46,783 at the 2000 census. The La Mirada Theatre for the Performing Arts and the Splash! La Mirada Regional Aquatics Center are two of its major attractions. It is the home of Biola University, an evangelical Christian institution of higher education.

History

La Mirada (Spanish for the look) was the creation of two men, Andrew McNally, a printer and mapmaker from Chicago (see Rand McNally) and his son-in-law Edwin Neff. He developed  into his own home called Windermere Ranch and surrounded it with olive, orange and lemon groves. McNally built a plant to process the olive oil, which was of the best quality, as well as a railroad station on Stage Road. From here his olive oil and fruit were shipped all over the U.S.

In 1896, McNally turned his property over to his daughter and his son-in-law. McNally and Neff formed the La Mirada Land Company, which published a booklet entitled "The Country Gentleman in California", advertising parcels of land for sale including pictures, a map and descriptions of the scenic olive, alfalfa, lemon and grapefruit groves.

In 1946, "Along Your Way", a "Station by Station Description of the Santa Fe Route Through the Southwest," describes La Mirada with a population of 213, surrounded by orange, lemon, walnut and olive groves; oil wells; olive oil factory; and fruit packing houses.

The city received a lot of attention for the fact that it was going to be completely structured and planned out. Referred to as "the Nation's completely planned city" during the early 1950s, the city of La Mirada received a lot of attention from the State Fair. The Fair praised the city for planning for the future while still maintaining practicality for today.

In 1953, the land was sold to subdivisions for 5.2 million dollars, one of the largest real estate transactions in California. 
In 1954, Louis M. Halper, a prominent Southland residential and commercial builder, purchased 2,100 acres of La Mirada land for $8,000,000. Halper launched construction on what was to be a $150,000,000 community with schools, shopping centers, and 10,000 homes that he completed by the end of two years. His firm had taken over the acreage from a group of corporations and Harold L. Shaw, who launched the original La Mirada development. He said at the time the entire community would be redesigned for maximum advantages of a modern planned city. Halper had developed a new pattern for community development by wholesaling land to other builders and establishing the La Mirada Civic Council to control quality. Three and four-bedroom homes were sold in the $13,000 price range. By 1960, the year the city was incorporated, La Mirada had grown from a mere 100 homes to over 8,000. The city was incorporated as "Mirada Hills" on March 23, 1960. On  November 8, 1960, voters approved a change of name to the current La Mirada, which was officially certified on December 15, 1960.

Today, the current population is just over 50,000 with the addition of a new subdivision on the eastern portion of the town.

Geography
The city is on the border between Orange and Los Angeles counties. The cities that border it on the Los Angeles County side are Santa Fe Springs to the west and Cerritos to the southwest; and unincorporated areas of Los Angeles County such as East Whittier, and South Whittier to the north. The cities bordering it in Orange County are Fullerton and La Habra to the east and Buena Park to the south.

Demographics

2010
The 2010 United States Census reported that La Mirada had a population of 48,527. The racial makeup of La Mirada was 29,462 (60.7%) White (38.0% Non-Hispanic White), 1,099 (2.3%) African American, 394 (0.8%) Native American, 8,650 (17.8%) Asian, 142 (0.3%) Pacific Islander, 6,670 (13.7%) from other races, and 2,110 (4.3%) from two or more races. Hispanic or Latino of any race were 19,272 persons (39.7%).

The Census reported that 45,670 people (94.1% of the population) lived in households, 2,586 (5.3%) lived in non-institutionalized group quarters, and 271 (0.6%) were institutionalized.

There were 14,681 households, out of which 5,368 (36.6%) had children under the age of 18 living in them, 8,971 (61.1%) were opposite-sex married couples living together, 1,731 (11.8%) had a female householder with no husband present, 802 (5.5%) had a male householder with no wife present.  There were 544 (3.7%) unmarried opposite-sex partnerships, and 93 (0.6%) same-sex married couples or partnerships. 2,536 households (17.3%) were made up of individuals, and 1,578 (10.7%) had someone living alone who was 65 years of age or older. The average household size was 3.11.  There were 11,504 families (78.4% of all households); the average family size was 3.48.

The population was spread out, with 10,246 people (21.1%) under the age of 18, 7,092 people (14.6%) aged 18 to 24, 11,609 people (23.9%) aged 25 to 44, 12,203 people (25.1%) aged 45 to 64, and 7,377 people (15.2%) who were 65 years of age or older.  The median age was 37.9 years. For every 100 females, there were 92.2 males.  For every 100 females age 18 and over, there were 89.4 males.

The homeowner vacancy rate was 0.8%; the rental vacancy rate was 4.0%.  36,660 people (75.5% of the population) lived in owner-occupied housing units and 9,010 people (18.6%) lived in rental housing units.

During 2009–2013, La Mirada had a median household income of $81,961, with 7.0% of the population living below the federal poverty line.

2000
As of the census of 2000, there were 46,783 people, 14,580 households, and 11,518 families residing in the city. The population density was 5,960.6 inhabitants per square mile (2,301.0/km2). The racial makeup of the city was 64.46% White, 1.93% Black or African American, 0.75% American Indian, 14.88% Asian, 0.27% Pacific Islander, 13.64% from other races, and 4.08% from two or more races.  33.47% of the population were Hispanic or Latino of any race.

There were 14,580 households, out of which 37.4% had children under the age of 18 living with them, 64.1% were married couples living together, 10.4% had a female householder with no husband present, and 21.0% were non-families. 17.3% of all households were made up of individuals, and 10.0% had someone living alone who was 65 years of age or older.  The average household size was 3.10 and the average family size was 3.49.

In the city, the population was spread out, with 26.2% under the age of 18, 10.7% from 18 to 24, 28.5% from 25 to 44, 20.8% from 45 to 64, and 13.8% who were 65 years of age or older.  The median age was 35 years. For every 100 females, there were 93.3 males.  For every 100 females age 18 and over, there were 88.3 males.

The median income for a household in the city was $61,632, and the median income for a family was $66,598 (these figures had risen to $77,952 and $87,037 respectively as of a 2007 estimate). Males had a median income of $47,364 versus $31,993 for females. The per capita income for the city was $22,404.  About 3.7% of families and 5.6% of the population were below the poverty line, including 6.1% of those under age 18 and 4.5% of those age 65 or over.

Government and politics
The city is governed by a five-member council-manager government. Voters began electing council members by district in March 2017 in order to avoid litigation for alleged violation of the California Voting Rights Act. Each year the five members vote one of themselves to be the Mayor and Mayor Pro Tem.

The Los Angeles County Department of Health Services operates the Whittier Health Center in Whittier, serving La Mirada.

Emergency services
The Los Angeles County Sheriff's Department (LASD) operates the Norwalk Station in Norwalk, serving La Mirada. In addition the department operates the La Mirada Substation.

The Norwalk Station is also responsible for providing contracted police services to the city of Norwalk as well as unincorporated South Whittier. The department has a substation in La Mirada located adjacent to City Hall.

Crime in La Mirada is consistently lower than in neighboring communities and fell 8.9% in 2018 after spiking close to 30% over the three previous years, mirroring the experiences of most communities across the state.

Fire protection and paramedic services are provided by the Los Angeles County Fire Department (LACoFD). The department maintains Station #49 in La Mirada adjacent to City Hall, provides coverage to the central parts of the city. Station 49 also serves as the headquarters for Battalion 21.

In May 2010, a ribbon cutting was held to celebrate the opening of a second fire station operating in the city. Station 194 moved from its temporary home at 1401 South Beach Boulevard into the new quarters at 13540 Beach Boulevard. The site was chosen as it provides first-in coverage to the city of La Habra, which funded half of the cost of the construction project.

In return for investment towards the construction of Station 194, La Habra now enjoys the benefits of having a fourth Paramedic Assessment Fire Engine serving the city at no cost to La Habra taxpayers for a 20-year period (La Habra signed a ten-year fire service agreement extension in 2015). The entire cost of the four-person crew is funded by the County Fire District in which La Mirada belongs.

The construction of the new fire station, which was a key component of this agreement, was completed in just over four years after a series of design and construction delays. Neighborhoods in eastern La Mirada that once experienced six-minute response (travel) times can now be reached in three minutes or less.

Crews from two nearby stations also include parts of La Mirada as their first-in district. Engine 35, stationed in Cerritos on Artesia Boulevard, covers most of the industrial areas of the city that are south of Interstate 5.

Station 15 located in East La Mirada on Santa Gertrudes Avenue handles the north and northeast sections of town. The four-person crew assigned to Quint 15 now staff the only truck company in the area. In addition to ladder truck duties a Quint also has the ability to pump water at a fire. Prior to the 2005 reduction of staff at the La Mirada Boulevard station, there was a truck staffed as well as the engine and paramedic squad currently staffed.

La Mirada both receives and provides assistance to neighboring fire agencies called for in agreements called automatic aid.

In the southern part of the city, resources based in Buena Park and South Santa Fe Springs respond to fires instead of County Fire resources further away and the favor is returned in designated areas outside of La Mirada.

The La Mirada-based Paramedic-Unit, Squad 49 also responds to medical emergencies in Satna Fe Springs when that city's medics are unavailable.

An expanded agreement went into effect in 2018 with the City of Fullerton that has seen a sharp increase in the response by La Mirada fire resources to both medical and fire calls there by both Squad 49, and Engine 194 Beach and Hillsborough Station.

Education
Public education in a majority of La Mirada is governed by the Norwalk-La Mirada Unified School District, headquartered in neighboring Norwalk. La Mirada has one public secondary school, La Mirada High School.

The Creek Park and Granada Heights neighborhoods in northern La Mirada are within the boundaries of the East Whittier City School District K - 8th grade, the Whittier Union High School District, and Rio Hondo College District all with campuses in nearby Whittier.

Several private schools are located in La Mirada:
 St. Paul of the Cross School in the Foster Park neighborhood
 Beatitudes of Our Lord School

The city is home to one private higher education institution, Biola University.

According city's 2017 Demographic Overview (which is collected from sources deemed reliable, including US Census, ESRI, GCR Marketing Network, Claritas, HDL and city, state & county data), approximately 26.23% of the population have some college education, 9.8% have an associate degree, 20.08% have a Bachelor's degree, 8.05% have a Master's Degree, and 1.05% have a Doctorate Degree.

Transportation
Metrolink operates commuter rail service on this right-of-way; the nearest stations to La Mirada are Buena Park and Norwalk/Santa Fe Springs. Public transportation is provided by the Los Angeles County Metropolitan Transportation Authority (Metro), Norwalk Transit, and Montebello Bus Lines.

The main arterial streets running west-to-east are Rosecrans Avenue, Alondra Boulevard, and Imperial Highway. The main arterial streets running south-to-north are Valley View Avenue, La Mirada Boulevard, and Santa Gertrudes Avenue. Leffingwell Road runs along the north end of the city, and Artesia Boulevard runs along the south end of the city. Interstate 5 passes briefly through the southwest corner of the city, while Beach Boulevard (SR 39) passes briefly through the east end of the city.

Freight railroad traffic through the city is handled by BNSF Railway on its right-of-way in the southwest portion of the city. Union Pacific Railroad operates a rail line along Interstate 5 and serves the southern industrial areas south of I-5.

Economy

Top employers
According to the city's 2017 Demographic Overview, the top employers in the city are:

Notable people

 Gary Allan, country singer, born in La Mirada
 Derby Carillo, American-born Salvadoran soccer player
 Tony Corrente, NFL referee
 Chase De Leo, professional ice hockey player for the New Jersey Devils
 Jennie Finch, Olympic softball player
 Steven L. Kwast, Air Force lieutenant general
Janine Lindemulder, porn actress
Cole McDonald, football player for the Toronto Argonauts
 Keith McGill, football player for the Oakland Raiders
 Shotaro Omori, American figure skater
 Daniel Poncedeleon, Major League Baseball pitcher for the St. Louis Cardinals
 Russell Poole an LAPD Detective noted for the investigation into the deaths of rap star Notorious B.I.G. and the cop to cop shooting between LAPD officers, Kevin Gaines and Frank Lyga. In addition to uncovering of LAPD notorious Rampart Scandal
 Amber Riley, actor and singer best known for her role in Glee
Ryan Vargas, NASCAR driver
 Derrick Williams, basketball player for the Sacramento Kings
 Eric Winter, actor best known for his role in Days of Our Lives
 YTCracker, former hacker, nerdcore rapper

See also

References

External links

City-Data.com Profile

 
1896 establishments in California
1960 establishments in California
Cities in Los Angeles County, California
Incorporated cities and towns in California
Populated places established in 1896
Populated places established in 1960
Gateway Cities